This is a list of members of the seventh parliament of the South Australian House of Assembly, which sat from 19 January 1872 until 14 January 1875. The members were elected at the 1871 colonial election.

Notes
 The Sturt MHA John Henry Barrow died on 22 August 1874. William Mair won the resulting by-election on 7 September.
 Thomas Reynolds and William Everard were initially declared elected as the two members for Encounter Bay, but their election was challenged and they were unseated on 2 February 1872. A by-election was held on 29 February, which saw Reynolds re-elected and Everard defeated by William Rogers.
 The member for Mount Barker, William West, changed his name to William West-Erskine in June 1872.
 The Burra MHA John Hart died on 28 January 1873. Rowland Rees won the resulting by-election on 3 April.
 Victoria MHA John Riddoch resigned on 28 April 1873. Park Laurie won the resulting by-election on 29 May.
 Victoria MHA Edwin Derrington resigned by 6 May 1873. Thomas Boothby won the resulting by-election on 17 June.
 Encounter Bay MHA Thomas Reynolds resigned on 28 August 1873. Arthur Fydell Lindsay won the resulting by-election on 5 September.
 Light MHA Mountifort Conner resigned on 11 September 1873. Randolph Isham Stow won the resulting by-election on 18 September. He was elected to Albert 22 Feb 1875 and resigned 23 Jun 1875.

References
Statistical Record of the Legislature 1836-2007, Parliament of SA, www.parliament.sa.gov.au

Members of South Australian parliaments by term
19th-century Australian politicians